Make me no 1 is a song written by Amir Aly, Henrik Wikström, Ingela "Pling" Forsman and Maria Haukaas Mittet. The song is performed by the singer Felicia Olsson and is one of the 32 contributions in the Swedish song contest Melodifestivalen 2013.

References

Artisterna klara för Göteborg

2012 songs
Songs written by Henrik Wikström
Songs with lyrics by Ingela Forsman
Songs written by Amir Aly